Gašo Knežević (15 September 1953 – 14 March 2014) was a Serbian law scholar and professor at the University of Belgrade's Law School. He served as the Minister of Education and Sports in the Government of Serbia from 2001 to 2004. He also served as the Minister of Higher and High Education in the transitional government from 2000 to 2001.

Knežević was a member and a high-ranking official of the Civic Alliance of Serbia. He died in March 2014.

References

1953 births
2014 deaths
Academic staff of the University of Belgrade
Civic Alliance of Serbia politicians
Lawyers from Belgrade
University of Belgrade Faculty of Law alumni
Education ministers of Serbia
Yugoslav lawyers